Mehran (also Romanized as Mehrān; formerly, Mansurabad (Persian: منصورآباد), also Romanized as Mansūrābād) is a city in and the capital of Mehran County, Ilam Province, Iran. At the 2006 census, its population was 13,118, in 2,958 families.

Mehran is located near Iran's western border with Iraq. Because of its strategic proximity - only two hours' drive from Baghdad - the city has played a continuing role in dealings between Iran and Iraq.

In May 1981, during the Iran–Iraq War, Iraqi forces captured Mehran, on the western plain of the Zagros Mountains in Ilam Province, and pushed eastward to the mountain base. Along with other Iraqi forces, they had been driven out by 1982-83.

Demographics 
The city is mostly populated by Kurds with a small Luri minority.

Climate 
Mehran has a hot semi-arid climate (Köppen BSh).

Economy

Border trade
In December 2022 Mehran border market accounts for 23 percent of Iran' total exports to Iraq.

See also
Qasr-e Shirin

References

External links

 Iran–Iraq War
 People's militia
 News site
 Investigations about population movements
 News about immigration
 News site

Populated places in Mehran County
Cities in Ilam Province
Iran–Iraq border crossings
Kurdish settlements in Ilam Province
Luri settlements in Ilam Province